Roald Dahl's Matilda the Musical (Soundtrack from the Netflix Film) is the soundtrack to the 2022 film Roald Dahl's Matilda the Musical, which is based on the stage musical of the same name. It was released by Milan Records digitally on 18 November 2022 with a physical CD release following on 9 December 2022. The album featured 22 tracks, including songs from the stage musical as well as a new closing number written by Tim Minchin, and the incidental underscore composed by Christopher Nightingale.

Background 
In November 2013, when the film adaptation of Matilda the Musical was reported to be under production, Tim Minchin who previously wrote songs for the musical, was in talks to write new songs for the film. His involvement was officially confirmed in January 2020. Christopher Nightingale, who worked as the orchestrator and music supervisor on the stage production, had underscored the incidental music, while Becky Berntham served as the film's music supervisor. Nightingale said "The diversity of the songs is gloriously far-reaching, and my first job in writing the original score was to try and build a framework that might bind things together; find, create and extend common ground."

The soundtrack list to Matilda the Musical was released by Sony Masterworks and Netflix Music on 4 November 2022. The album featured much of the songs featured in the stage musical as well as a new closing number written for the film, that kept undisclosed (later titled "Still Holding My Hand").  The song was performed by Alisha Weir and Lashana Lynch at the Netflix Playlist—a virtual music showcase event. Minchin, who wrote the closing track, said, "The movie really called for an ending number, because films don't have curtain calls. So it needed to be wrapped up. It needed all the thematic and musical traits to be tied with a nice bow." Nine tracks from Nightingale's instrumental compositions he underscored, also accompany the album.

The album was released on 18 November 2022 through digital music streaming providers and was released on CD on 9 December. Prior to the official release, the track "Revolting Children" was released as a single on 11 November.

Reception 
Writing for BroadwayWorld, Bobby Patrick said "Minchen & Co have adapted the score to suit the film medium, the cast has made good meals of their singing assignments, and the additional instrumental scoring by Nightengale is, quite frankly, gorgeous. Most everything is in exciting minor keys, throughout, that give the requisite drama overall, and there are treats to be heard. Is it the Broadway show? No, but it's not supposed to be, cuz it's a 'movie'! In all, this album is a fine adaptation of the familiar and we enjoyed most of it, and can forgive the cuts made between mediums." Ian Bowkett of Musical Theatre Review said "With this album in your headphones, you will find yourself striding determinedly around the streets, ready to cause trouble and fight against the world's many injustices. Until a number like ‘When I Grow Up’ or ‘My House’ makes you cry like a child."

Track listing

Personnel 
 Score composer: Chris Nightingale 
 Score engineer: Rupert Coulson, Alex Ferguson
 Score editor: Chris Barrett
 Mixing: Rupert Coulson
 Digital recordist: Alex Ferguson
 Assistant engineers: Ashley Andrew-Jones, Rebecca Hordern, Jedidiah Rimell
 Orchestra: Isobel Griffiths Ltd.
 Orchestration: Andrew Dudman, Neil Dawes

Charts

Release history

References 

2022 soundtrack albums
Sony Music soundtracks
Musical film soundtracks
Matilda (novel)
Tim Minchin albums